Beautiful People Will Ruin Your Life is the fourth major studio album by British rock band The Wombats. The album was released on 9 February 2018. The first single from the album, "Lemon to a Knife Fight", was released on 7 November 2017. This was followed by "Turn", "Cheetah Tongue", and "Black Flamingo".

Reception

Beautiful People Will Ruin Your Life received positive reviews from critics, with NME saying "there's nothing groundbreaking here, but little to be ashamed of either." In a positive review, PopMatters describes the album's songs as "excellent workouts in powerful pop-rock."

Track listing

Personnel

 Matthew Murphy – lead vocals, guitars, keyboards, production
 Dan Haggis – drums, percussion, keyboards, guitars, backing vocals, production
 Tord Øverland Knudsen – bass guitar, keyboards, backing vocals, production
 Mark Crew – production, keyboards (tracks 1, 2, 5, 6, 7, 8)
 Catherine Marks – production, programming (tracks 1, 2, 3, 5, 7, 9, 11)
 Marius D. Hagan – guitar (track 3)
 Kianja – vocals (track 5)
 Rich Costey – mixing
 Martin Cooke – mixing assistance
 Nicolas Fournier – mixing assistance
 Vlado Meller – mastering
 Adam 'Cecil' Bartlett – engineering
 Rob Whiteley – engineering
 Richie Kennedy – engineering assistance
 Lucas Donaud – artwork, design

Charts

References

The Wombats albums
2018 albums